Painted Skin is a 2008 supernatural-fantasy film directed by Gordon Chan, starring Donnie Yen, Chen Kun, Zhou Xun, Zhao Wei, Sun Li and Qi Yuwu. Although the film is based partly on a supernatural premise, it is more of an action-romance than a horror film. Painted Skin is based, very loosely, on "The Painted Skin", a short story from the collection Strange Stories from a Chinese Studio. The theme song of the film, Huà Xīn (畫心; Painted Heart), was performed by Jane Zhang.

Plot
The film is set sometime in the late Qin dynasty or early Han dynasty. In the desert, General Wang Sheng and his men attack a Xiongnu camp, where Wang chances upon a maiden called "Xiaowei" and brings her home. Xiaowei is actually a fox spirit who feasts on human hearts to maintain her lovely and youthful appearance. Trouble brews when Xiaowei falls in love with Wang, who already has a wife, Peirong.

Another love triangle is also present, with the members being Wang Sheng, Peirong and Pang Yong. Pang Yong is a former general in the same army as Wang Sheng. He was in love with Peirong, but she married Wang Sheng eventually. A series of mysterious murders occur in the city and the victims have their hearts dug out. Peirong becomes suspicious of Xiaowei after a diviner told her that Xiaowei is actually a demon and after she accidentally cut Xiaowei but Xiaowei showed no sign of bleeding. Peirong approaches Pang Yong for help. In the meantime, Pang Yong meets Xia Bing, a young and inexperienced demon hunter, and befriends her. The murders were actually committed by Xiaoyi, a chameleon spirit who shows unrequited love towards Xiaowei and helps her obtain the human hearts she needs. Xiaoyi fought with Pang Yong and the soldiers on a few occasions and was nearly captured by Pang Yong but he always managed to escape. At the same time, Pang Yong and Xia Bing come to Wang Sheng's house and accuse Xiaowei of being a demon, but Xiaowei succeeds in maintaining her disguise, much to the ire of Peirong and Xia Bing.

When Xiaowei gets closer to Wang Sheng, Xiaoyi turns jealous and attacks Wang, but is driven away. When Xiaoyi meets Xiaowei again later, she is so furious that she shouts at him to leave, despite him warning her that love between demons and humans is impossible and pleading her to allow him to remain by her side. One night, Peirong's suspicions about Xiaowei are confirmed when she chances upon Xiaowei peeling off her human skin right in front of her and revealing her true form. Peirong and Xiaowei come to an agreement: Xiaowei promises to stop killing people; in return, Peirong offers her place as Wang Sheng's rightful spouse to Xiaowei and takes the blame for the murders. Xiaowei gives Peirong a potion to drink, after which Peirong's hair turns white and her features become "demonic". The city's residents are horrified when they see Peirong and think that she is the demon. Just as Peirong is about to be killed by the citizens, Pang Yong and Xia Bing show up, save her, and bring her to a cave.

Pang Yong and Xia Bing deduce that Peirong has been poisoned by the demon and she is close to death because the lighter the colour of the poison, the more fatal it is. Peirong is gradually turning white. Not long later, Wang Sheng, his soldiers and members of his household (including Xiaowei) come to the cave. Wang Sheng swears to kill Peirong if she is really a demon and is responsible for all the murders, but also expresses his love for her at the same time. Peirong then impales herself with a dagger Wang is holding on to and dies in his arms. Xiaowei tries to gain Wang Sheng's affection by moving closer to him, but he takes no notice of her and continues to weep while holding on to his dead wife's body. At this point, Xiaowei realises that Wang Sheng will never truly love her.

Pang Yong shouts to everyone that Xiaowei is the real demon and then slashes her with his weapon to prove it, but her body is as hard as steel. Wang Sheng approaches Xiaowei and begs her to bring Peirong back to life. When Xiaowei asks him what she will get if she restores Peirong to life, Wang replies that he loves her but he already has Peirong, and then kills himself. The heartbroken Xiaowei screams and reveals her true demon form. She then willingly attempts to bring Wang back to life with her magic powers in the form of a small orb. However, before she can do so, she is interrupted by Xiaoyi, who snatches away the orb and reprimands her for sacrificing all the powers she cultivated over thousands of years to save a man's life. He swallows the orb and tells her he is going to bring her home. Pang Yong and Xia Bing fight with Xiaoyi and eventually slay him but he kills Pang in the process. Xiaowei retrieves the orb from Xiaoyi's body and another orb containing Xiaoyi's powers, and uses them to bring every dead person in the cave back to life.

Before the film ends, Xiaowei is shown manifested in her white fox form without her powers because she has already given them up to bring Peirong and Wang Sheng back to life.

Cast
Donnie Yen as Pang Yong (龐勇)
Zhou Xun as Xiaowei (小唯)
Chen Kun as Wang Sheng (王生)
Zhao Wei as Peirong (佩蓉)
Sun Li as Xia Bing (夏冰)
Qi Yuwu as Xiaoyi (小易)

Reception
The box office for "Painted Skin" broke 100 million yuan, or 14 million US Dollars, six days after its premiere, thereby setting a new milestone for Chinese films.

Awards and nominations
3rd Asian Film Awards
 Nominated: Best Actress (Zhao Wei)
 Nominated: Best Production Design

10th Changchun Film Festival
Won: Best Film Score (Fujiwara Ikuro)

27th Golden Rooster Awards
 Nominated: Best Director (Gordon Chan)
 Nominated: Best Actress (Zhao Wei)
 Nominated: Best Supporting Actress (Sun Li)

28th Hong Kong Film Awards
Won: Best Cinematography (Arthur Wong)
Won: Best Original Film Song (Fujiwara Ikuro, Keith Chan, Jane Zhang)
Nominated: Best Film
Nominated: Best Screenplay (Gordon Chan, Lau Ho-Leung & Kwong Man-Wai)
Nominated: Best Actress (Zhou Xun)
Nominated: Best Supporting Actress (Sun Li)
Nominated: Best Art Direction (Bill Lui & Liu Jingping)
Nominated: Best Costume Makeup Design (Ng Po-Ling)
Nominated: Best Action Choreography (Stephen Tung)
Nominated: Best Original Film Score (Fujiwara Ikuro)
Nominated: Best Sound Editing (Kinson Tsang & Lai Chi-Hung)
Nominated: Best Visual Effects (Ng Yuen-Fai, Chas Chau & Tam Kai-Kwan)

30th Hundred Flowers Awards
Won: Best Actor (Chen Kun)
Nominated: Best Actress (Zhou Xun)
Nominated: Best Supporting Actress (Sun Li)
 
16th Spring Swallow Awards
Won: Best Actress in a Motion Picture (Zhao Wei)

2nd Vietnam DAN Movie Awards
Won: Favorite Chinese Actress (Zhao Wei)

Production
When the film was announced, Wilson Yip was reportedly directing with Fan Bingbing starring as the female lead. However, several months later the director's seat was changed from Yip to Gordon Chan instead, with Zhou Xun replacing Fan as well.

Television series
In March 2011, a Chinese television series also titled Painted Skin, which is based on the film, was aired on TVS4 in mainland China. Gordon Chan and the producers of the film Painted Skin were also involved in the production of this television series, which has a revised script and new cast members.

Sequel
In 2011, Gordon Chan announced that a sequel would be produced, and that Chen Kun, Zhou Xun, and Zhao Wei will be returning for the sequel, but that Donnie Yen would not. Other actors such as Yang Mi, Feng Shaofeng and Gordon Liu have joined the cast. Liu was cast to play the father of Chen's character, while Yang and Feng will be playing a pair of lovers. Chan chose Yang and Feng for the roles due to their popularity in the 2011 television series Palace.

The sequel, Painted Skin: The Resurrection, was completed and released in 2012. It grossed $115.07 million, and briefly became the highest grossing domestic film in China.

References

External links
 
 Painted Skin Homepage at Sina.com

2008 films
2000s Mandarin-language films
Hong Kong action films
2008 action films
Films set in the Qin dynasty
Films set in the Western Han dynasty
Films directed by Gordon Chan
Hong Kong fantasy films
Chinese romantic fantasy films
Demons in film
Painted Skin films
Chinese action films
2000s Hong Kong films